Gary Raymond Ignasiak (born September 1, 1949) is a former Major League Baseball player. He played part of one season with the Detroit Tigers. Ignasiak was drafted by the Detroit Tigers in the 36th round of the 1967 amateur draft, and appeared in 3 games with the Tigers in 1973, all as a relief pitcher. He had a career earned run average of 3.86, while having a career win/loss record of 0-0. Ignasiak played his final game September 29, 1973.

Gary's brother, Mike Ignasiak, also pitched in the majors.

External links

1949 births
Living people
Major League Baseball pitchers
Detroit Tigers players
Lakeland Tigers players
Rocky Mount Leafs players
Montgomery Rebels players
Evansville Triplets players
Clinton Pilots players
Batavia Trojans players
Gulf Coast Tigers players
Baseball players from Michigan
People from St. Clair County, Michigan
Sportspeople from Metro Detroit